Chong Eng (born on 6 July 1957), is a Malaysian politician who has served as Member of the Penang State Executive Council (EXCO) in the Pakatan Harapan (PH) state administration under Chief Ministers Lim Guan Eng and Chow Kon Yeow and as Member of the Penang State Legislative Assembly (MLA) for Padang Lalang since May 2018. She served as Member of Parliament (MP) of for Bukit Mertajam from November 1999 to May 2013 and MLA of Penang for Batu Lancang from April 1995 to November 1999. She is the member, Women Chief and Deputy Secretary-General of the Democratic Action Party (DAP), a component party of the state ruling but federal opposition Pakatan Harapan (PH) coalition, she also served as Women Chief of PH from March to September 2021. She is also Deputy Head for Women Parliamentary Caucus and sits as a Standing Order Committee member. She also served in the Women Crisis Center and Community AIDS Service Penang.

Family
She is married to Gunabalan Krishnasamy who is an artist. The couple have two boys, Jothi, who is assisting his mother in political endeavors and Omprekash who is now a 3-time Malaysia book of records breaking athlete, and artist for Koi Tribe, an international web3 magazine.

Personal life and education
She was born in a Chinese new village in Pahang from a family of 10 siblings. She started her primary education in the only Chinese primary school in the village. She was also the first girl from the village to pursue her study in a local university, namely Universiti Pertanian Malaysia (now Universiti Putra Malaysia (UPM)). She eventually obtained her bachelor of Science degree in Human Development Studies from UPM. Now, she writes regularly in local Chinese dailies and have published three books.

Political career
Chong started her political career as a full-time research officer in 1990 with DAP Penang. Chong won the Batu Lanchang state constituency in 1995 Malaysian general election and became the first women to be elected into the Penang State Assembly. She was the sole opposition representative in the state assembly at that time. She subsequently were elected as Bukit Mertajam Member of Parliament in 1999, 2004 and 2008 general elections. She then contested and won the Penang state seat of Padang Lalang in 2013 and 2018 general elections. On 18 March 2021, she was appointed as Women Chief of the Pakatan Harapan (PH) opposition coalition.

Election results

References

1957 births
Living people
People from Pahang
Malaysian politicians of Chinese descent
Democratic Action Party (Malaysia) politicians
Members of the Dewan Rakyat
Women members of the Dewan Rakyat
Members of the Penang State Legislative Assembly
Women MLAs in Penang
Penang state executive councillors
21st-century Malaysian politicians
21st-century Malaysian women politicians